This is chronological list of action films originally released in the 2010s. Often there may be considerable overlap particularly between action and other genres (including, horror, comedy, and science fiction films); the list should attempt to document films which are more closely related to action, even if they bend genres.

2010

2011

2012

2013

2014

2015

2016

2017

2018

2019

See also
 Action films
 Martial arts films
 Swashbuckler films

Notes

2010s
 
Action